Sideroxylon is a genus of trees in the family Sapotaceae described as a genus by Linnaeus in 1753. They are collectively known as bully trees. The generic name is derived from the Greek words σιδηρος (sideros), meaning "iron", and ξύλον (xylon), meaning "wood."

Distribution
The genus is distributed mainly in North and South America, but also in Africa, Madagascar, southern Asia, and various oceanic islands. Some species, such as gum bully (S. lanuginosum), S. tenax, and buckthorn bully (S. lycioides), are found in subtropical areas of North America. The only South African species, the white milkwood (S. inerme), is associated with three historical sites, and these individuals were declared national monuments due to their unusual longevity.

Ecology
Several species have become rare due to logging and other forms of habitat destruction. The Tambalacoque (S. grandiflorum, syn. Calvaria major) of Mauritius was affected by the extinction of the birds which dispersed its seed; it was suggested that the species entirely depended on the dodo (Raphus cucullatus) for that purpose and nearly became a victim of coextinction, but this is not correct. Bully trees provide food for the larvae of certain Lepidoptera, such as the bumelia webworm moth (Urodus parvula) as well as several species of Coleoptera of the genus Plinthocoelium, commonly known as bumelia borers.

Species
Accepted species

 Sideroxylon acunae  - Cuba
 Sideroxylon alachuense  - Florida
 Sideroxylon altamiranoi  - Hidalgo, Querétaro
 Sideroxylon americanum  - Yucatan, West Indies
 Sideroxylon anomalum  - Barahona
 Sideroxylon beguei  - Madagascar
 Sideroxylon bequaertii  - Zaïre
 Sideroxylon betsimisarakum  - Madagascar
 Sideroxylon borbonicum  - Réunion
 Sideroxylon boutonianum  - Mauritius
 Sideroxylon bullatum  - Jamaica
 Sideroxylon canariense  - Canary Is
 Sideroxylon cantoniense  - SE China
 Sideroxylon capiri  - Mesoamerica, West Indies
 Sideroxylon capuronii  - Madagascar
 Sideroxylon cartilagineum  - Sinaloa, Jalisco, Guerrero
 Sideroxylon celastrinum  - Texas, Mesoamerica, Colombia, Venezuela, Cuba, Bahamas
 Sideroxylon cinereum  - Mauritius
 Sideroxylon contrerasii  - Mesoamerica
 Sideroxylon cubense  - West Indies
 Sideroxylon discolor  - Socotra
 Sideroxylon dominicanum  - Dominican Rep
 Sideroxylon durifolium  - Chiapas, Belize
 Sideroxylon ekmanianum   - Cuba
 Sideroxylon eriocarpum   - Oaxaca
 Sideroxylon eucoriaceum  - Veracruz, Guatemala
 Sideroxylon eucuneifolium  - Guatemala
 Sideroxylon excavatum  - Guerrero, Oaxaca
 Sideroxylon fimbriatum  - Socotra
 Sideroxylon floribundum  - Belize, Guatemala, Jamaica
 Sideroxylon foetidissimum  - West Indies, S Mexico, Guatemala, Belize, Florida
 Sideroxylon galeatum  - Rodrigues
 Sideroxylon gerrardianum  - Madagascar
 Sideroxylon grandiflorum  - Mauritius
 Sideroxylon hirtiantherum  - Guatemala, Honduras
 Sideroxylon horridum  - Cuba, Cayman Is
 Sideroxylon ibarrae  - Baja Verapaz
 Sideroxylon inerme  - Africa (from Somalia to Cape Province), Aldabra, Juan de Nova I
 Sideroxylon jubilla  - Cuba
 Sideroxylon lanuginosum  – - United States (AZ to SC + KY), NE Mexico
 Sideroxylon leucophyllum  - Baja California, Sonora
 Sideroxylon lycioides  – buckthorn bully - United States (TX to DE)
 Sideroxylon macrocarpum  - Georgia
 Sideroxylon majus  Réunion
 Sideroxylon marginatum  - Cape Verde
 Sideroxylon mascatense  - from Ethiopia to Pakistan
 Sideroxylon mirmulans  - Madeira
 Sideroxylon moaense  - Cuba
 Sideroxylon montanum  - Jamaica
 Sideroxylon nadeaudii  - Tahiti
 Sideroxylon nervosum  - Myanmar
 Sideroxylon obovatum  - West Indies, Venezuela
 Sideroxylon obtusifolium  - from Veracruz to Paraguay
 Sideroxylon occidentale  - Baja California, Sonora
 Sideroxylon octosepalum   - Clarendon
 Sideroxylon oxyacanthum  - Ethiopia, Eritrea, Saudi Arabia
 Sideroxylon palmeri   - Mexico
 Sideroxylon peninsulare  - Baja California
 Sideroxylon persimile  - Mesoamerica, Colombia, Venezuela, Trinidad
 Sideroxylon picardae  - Hispaniola
 Sideroxylon polynesicum  - Hawaii, Rapa-Iti
 Sideroxylon portoricense  - Mesoamerica, Greater Antilles
 Sideroxylon puberulum  - Mauritius
 Sideroxylon reclinatum  - United States (LA, MS, AL, GA, FL, SC)
 Sideroxylon repens  - Hispaniola
 Sideroxylon retinerve  - Honduras
 Sideroxylon rotundifolium  - Jamaica
 Sideroxylon rubiginosum  - Dominican Rep
 Sideroxylon salicifolium  - West Indies, Mesoamerica, Florida
 Sideroxylon saxorum  - Madagascar
 Sideroxylon sessiliflorum  - Mauritius
 Sideroxylon socorrense  - Socorro I
 Sideroxylon st-johnianum  - Henderson I
 Sideroxylon stenospermum  - Mesoamerica
 Sideroxylon stevensonii  - Chiapas, Belize, Guatemala
 Sideroxylon tambolokoko  - Madagascar
 Sideroxylon tenax  - United States (FL, GA, SC, NC)
 Sideroxylon tepicense  - Mesoamerica
 Sideroxylon thornei   (Cronquist) T.D.Penn. - USA (FL, GA, AL)
 Sideroxylon verruculosum  - Mexico
 Sideroxylon wightianum  - Guizhou, Yunnan, Guangdong, Vietnam

Formerly placed here
 Argania spinosa  (as S. spinosum )
 Micropholis acutangula  (as S. acutangulum )
 Micropholis crassipedicellata  (as S. crassipedicellatum )
 Micropholis guyanensis  (as S. guyanense )
 Micropholis rugosa  (as S. rugosum )
 Olinia ventosa  (as S. cymosum )
 Planchonella australis  (as S. australe )
 Planchonella costata  (as S. costatum )
 Planchonella eerwah  (as S. eerwah )
 Pouteria elegans  (as S. elegans )
 Pouteria macrantha  (as S. macranthum )
 Pouteria sapota  (as S. sapota )
 Pouteria reticulata  (as S.  uniloculare )
 Synsepalum dulcificum  (as S. dulcificum'' )

References

External links 

 
Sapotaceae genera